Pea Island is an island which is part of the Outer Banks of North Carolina.  Because of the shifting nature of the barrier island system of which Pea Island is a part, and the way in which inlets open and close over time, Pea Island has, at times, been contiguous with the neighboring islands of Bodie Island or Hatteras Island.  Pea Island was created when two inlets, the New Inlet in 1738, and Oregon Inlet in 1846, separated it from the neighboring islands.  The island was rejoined to Hatteras Island intermittently from 1922 until 1945 as the narrow New Inlet opened and closed with shifting sands.   From 1945 to 2011, Pea Island was merely the northern 11 miles or so of Hatteras Island. Hurricane Irene reopened the New Inlet, making Pea Island separate again, although it has since reconnected with Hatteras. Pea Island was home to the Pea Island Life-Saving Station, the first U.S. Coast Guard life-saving station to have an all African-American crew.  Since 1937, it has also been home to the Pea Island National Wildlife Refuge.

External links

Outer Banks
Islands of North Carolina
Islands of Dare County, North Carolina